Carlos Augustus Sperry was the Democratic President of the West Virginia Senate from Greenbrier County and served in 1872.

References

Democratic Party West Virginia state senators
Presidents of the West Virginia State Senate
People from Greenbrier County, West Virginia
1832 births
1902 deaths
19th-century American politicians